Campo Redondo is a municipality in the state of Rio Grande do Norte in the Northeast region of Brazil. According to the census conducted by the IBGE (Brazilian Institute of Geography and Statistics) in the year 2010, its population is 10 427 inhabitants. In 2022, the same body carried out the demographic census of 2022 and released the previous results of the Census. According to IBGE, Campo Redondo had a population deficit, with 210 fewer inhabitants compared to the 2010 Census. The territorial extension of the municipality is 213 km². 

Campo Redondo is bordered by the municipalities of São Tomé and Lajes Pintadas (north), Currais Novos (west), Santa Cruz (east) and Coronel Ezequiel (south). It is also bordered by the state of Paraíba (southwest).

See also
List of municipalities in Rio Grande do Norte

References

Municipalities in Rio Grande do Norte